The Division I Group A tournament was played in Přerov, Czech Republic, while the Division I Group B was played in Ventspils, Latvia, both running from 6 to 12 April 2014. The winner of the Division I Group A advanced to the Top Division Playoff for the 2015 championships against the last team of the 2014 Winter Olympics tournament, Japan. The last-placed team of the Division I Group A was relegated to the 2015 Division I Group B. The Group B winners moved up to Group A, while the last placed team was relegated to the 2015 Division II Group A. Divisions I A and I B represent the second and the third tier of the IIHF World Women's Championships.

Division I Group A

Final standings

Results
All times are local (UTC+2).

Awards and statistics

Awards
Best players selected by the directorate:
 Best Goalkeeper:  Klára Peslarová
 Best Defenseman:  Silje Holos
 Best Forward:  Andrea Schjelderup Dalen
Source: IIHF.com

Scoring leaders
List shows the top skaters sorted by points, then goals.

GP = Games played; G = Goals; A = Assists; Pts = Points; +/− = Plus/minus; PIM = Penalties in minutes; POS = PositionSource: IIHF.com

Leading goaltenders
Only the top five goaltenders, based on save percentage, who have played at least 40% of their team's minutes, are included in this list.
TOI = Time on Ice (minutes:seconds); SA = Shots against; GA = Goals against; GAA = Goals against average; Sv% = Save percentage; SO = ShutoutsSource: IIHF.com

Division I Group B

Final standings

Results
All times are local (UTC+3).

Awards and statistics

Awards
Best players selected by the directorate:
 Best Goalkeeper:  Evija Tētiņa
 Best Defenseman:  Dorottya Medgyes
 Best Forward:  Inese Geca-Miljone
Source: IIHF.com

Scoring leaders
List shows the top skaters sorted by points, then goals.

GP = Games played; G = Goals; A = Assists; Pts = Points; +/− = Plus/minus; PIM = Penalties in minutes; POS = PositionSource: IIHF.com

Leading goaltenders
Only the top five goaltenders, based on save percentage, who have played at least 40% of their team's minutes, are included in this list.
TOI = Time on Ice (minutes:seconds); SA = Shots against; GA = Goals against; GAA = Goals against average; Sv% = Save percentage; SO = ShutoutsSource: IIHF.com

References

External links
 Official website of IIHF

I
2014
2014 IIHF Women's World Championship Division I
World Championship Division I
IIHF Women's World Championship Division I
Latvian